From First to Last is an American post-hardcore band based in the Los Angeles Area and Tampa, Florida. Formed by Matt Good, Scott Oord, and Parker Nelms in November 1999, the current line-up consists of Matt Good (lead guitar, vocals), Sonny Moore (lead vocals), Travis Richter (rhythm guitar, unclean vocals), and Derek Bloom (drums).

The band released their first EP titled Aesthetic in 2003 which they recorded with founding member and vocalist Phillip Reardon who left the band in 2004 due to personal and creative differences. After signing with Epitaph Records, the band recruited Sonny Moore as their new vocalist. The band's first two albums, Dear Diary, My Teen Angst Has a Bodycount (2004) and Heroine (2006), were both underground successes, and sold a combined total of 304,000 copies in the United States without much radio airplay. The band also cultivated a large following on MySpace during this period, with the band's songs receiving over 20 million streams on the platform by March 2008.

Following the departure of Moore in February 2007 to work on his solo electronic project, the band added permanent bassist Matt Manning, and Good moved to lead vocals/guitar. After signing with Suretone Records, the band issued their third, self-titled studio album in 2008; it received mixed reviews, and despite receiving a high-profile marketing campaign from the label, the album undersold expectations. The band moved to Rise Records in late 2009, and not long after, Richter left the band. Their fourth studio album, Throne to the Wolves was released on March 16, 2010. On July 28, 2010, the band entered a hiatus.

In November 2013, the band re-formed, with Periphery vocalist Spencer Sotelo as the new lead vocalist, as well as Richter rejoining the band. They released their fifth album Dead Trees in April 2015. Sotelo departed the band in July 2016. Former vocalist Sonny Moore rejoined the band in January 2017. In May 2020 Matt Good admitted that while there are a few tracks that could be on a new album, he's unsure if it will ever come to fruition.

History

Formation and Aesthetic (1999–2003)

First Too Last was created in November 1999 in Tampa by Matt Good, Michael Blanchard and Scott Oord. Scott played bass, while Matt took on lead vocals and was convinced by Scott to also play guitar. Parker Nelms (drums) held practice at his house, but when the band began to travel, Parker was too young to do so. He was replaced by Steve Pullman to round out the lineup that, for the next three years, would play small shows in Florida.

In 2002, Matt joined the grindcore band The Color of Violence (at that time, called Slaughter vs Skeleton, Fetus Destroyer), where he met Travis Richter (guitar), who would later join First To Last, and Joey Antillion (bass). Some time later, Greg Taylor joined as (drums), who wrote about 4 songs, in which the Aesthetic Demos were created. After hearing the demos of what would be their first EP, Phillip Reardon (lead vocals) and Derek Bloom (drums) joined the band. By the end of the year, they had changed their name to From First To Last.

In 2003, the band released their debut EP Aesthetic on Four Leaf Recordings which featured the vocals of Reardon, Good and Richter. The EP was a underground success, and during that year, the band toured heavily across the United States with bands such as Spitafield and Alexisonfire. On September 5, 2003, From First To Last parted ways with Joey Antillion, who was subsequently replaced by Jon Weisberg for the band's remaining tour dates for that year. On November 13, 2003, the band announced that they had signed to Epitaph Records, and said they were planning on recording their debut album in January 2004.

Dear Diary, My Teen Angst Has a Bodycount (2004)

After the Aesthetic EP, the band wanted to move Matt Good to lead vocals. However, Good was reluctant to take on both lead vocal and lead guitar duties. He wanted From First to Last to have a frontman, to connect with the crowd better. Using the social networking site MySpace, Good came in contact with a guitarist and singer from California, Sonny Moore. Moore flew to Valdosta, Georgia, where Dear Diary, My Teen Angst Has a Bodycount was being recorded, and was set to be the band's rhythm guitarist. However, when the other band members heard Moore singing "Featuring Some of Your Favorite Words", they decided that he was much better suited for lead singer than guitarist.	 
			
Matt Good wrote the album in two weeks. Moore came in after the music was tracked and completed the vocals. Dear Diary, My Teen Angst Has a Bodycount was released on June 29, 2004. The album went on to sell over 100,000 copies in the United States by 2006.

From late May to mid-June 2005, From First to Last participated in the "Dead by Dawn" tour with bands Emanuel, Halifax and He Is Legend.

Heroine (2006)

The band went to Radio Star Studios in Weed, California to record their second album, produced by Ross Robinson. As their previous bassist Weisberg had been formally asked to leave the band due to internal conflicts, producer Ross Robinson asked Wes Borland, former Limp Bizkit guitarist, to play bass on the album. Borland later played several tours with the band. The album was released on March 21, 2006. It opened on the Billboard albums chart at No. 25, with first-week sales of over 33,000. Shortly thereafter in April, they signed to major label Capitol Records after bidding between that label and Warner Bros.

From mid March to mid May the band toured alongside Fall Out Boy, Hawthorne Heights and The All-American Rejects for the "Black Clouds and Underdogs Tour" in support of their release Heroine.

FFTL then did a short European Tour with various bands. The band then played several dates on the 2006 Vans Warped Tour, but were forced to drop out due to surgical removal of a nodule on Moore's vocal cords. He received his second nodule surgery in early July (his first being in May 2005). Following his recovery, From First to Last went out on the "World Championship Tour" supporting Atreyu along with Every Time I Die and Chiodos. While on that tour, Moore once again had vocal cord problems and had to leave the tour. The band had planned to have guitarists Good and Richter cover Moore's vocal duties for the duration of the tour until singer of Chiodos, Craig Owens, insisted that he provide lead vocals for their sets. Atreyu eventually forced From First to Last to drop the tour. The band later explained, "Our plan to enable us to play the rest of the tour was disregarded and as our crew was setting up for the show in Worcester, MA we were informed that we were being kicked off of the tour. Understand that it was not our choice to leave this tour... we were forced to leave." Atreyu then returned a statement about the controversy concerning From First to Last's departure, saying, "They couldn't perform as FFTL and are no longer on this tour."

Borland toured with From First To Last roughly since early 2006. He announced plans for a Fall 2006 tour that never went through due to Black Light Burns needing to find a new record label after Borland left Geffen Records. Borland has discussed plans to write and perform on the next From First To Last album, but he left the band due to Black Light Burns' busy schedule started to pick up, leaving no room for work with From First to Last.

Moore's departure, lineup instability and self-titled album (2007–2009)

In February 2007, lead singer Moore left From First to Last to pursue a solo career. His decision to leave was based on his urge to create his own music, and also due to the fact that singing in the band was putting an immense strain on his vocal cords, resulting in serious damage which needed multiple surgeries in order to be fixed. Moore posted new recordings on his Myspace and was part of a group of a band called Sonny and the Blood Monkeys. Moore now writes, produces, and performs music under the alias/stage name Skrillex, who has won 8 Grammy Awards for his electronic dance music, and now has 7 EP's and 3 Albums.	 
		 
After vocalist Moore's departure, From First to Last faced a crisis. Their label, Capitol Records, had dropped them due to financial problems. Without a vocalist, label, permanent bassist, or any money, the band almost split. Guitarist/Vocalist Matt Good, however, decided to take on lead vocals while still providing a backup guitar role. The band also quickly picked up Matt Manning to become a full-time bassist. The band then spent their remaining money on a studio in which to continue work on their already-written third album.	 
	 
The remaining members of From First to Last finished a headlining tour from July 21 through August 5 with guests Alesana, Vanna, Brighten, and Four Year Strong. Shortly before recording another album, the band played for a portion of the Show Must Go on tour with Hawthorne Heights, Secondhand Serenade, Powerspace, and Brighten, but later cancelled their dates on the last part of the tour to open for Deftones on a separate Canadian tour. 	 
		 
After completing a full mix of their new material, From First to Last was picked up by Suretone Records. Shortly after, they re-entered the studio to record their album again, this time with a professional crew and better quality. The band recorded this time in Los Angeles, with producer Josh Abraham and seasoned engineer Ryan Williams. 	 
		 
At midnight on November 14, 2007, they released the first single from the album, "Two as One", on their Myspace account, and they later played that song live on Jimmy Kimmel Live!. A video was made for the song "Worlds Away" which was highly publicized. Billboard premiered the album's next single "We All Turn Back to Dust" on January 23, 2008.	 
		 
Suretone Records organised a large scale marketing campaign for From First to Last in order to increase the band's mainstream exposure, which included partnerships with MySpace, Hot Topic and MTV. Most notably, Suretone negotiated a publishing deal with Electronic Arts which guaranteed that From First to Last's songs would appear in the next eleven video games released by the studio, including Madden NFL 09, FIFA 09 and Need for Speed: Undercover.	 
		 
Despite the album's marketing campaign, the album received mixed reviews and undersold expectations, only reaching number 81 on the Billboard 200 chart. Retrospectively, the band felt that the album was a failure in that it did not portray the true band as it was meant to be portrayed. Currently, they rarely, if ever, play any songs off this album, the only occasional one being the song "Deliverance!".	 
		 
From First to Last began their fall headlining tour, RATHER BE SLAYIN' N00BZ, starting November 1 with guests Blessthefall, A Skylit Drive, and Vanna. Around the middle of the tour, the guests changed to Envy on the Coast, Pierce The Veil, Four Year Strong, and Mayday Parade. 
		 
On November 29, From First to Last announced they were going to be a part of the 2008 Hot Topic Take Action Tour. They played at the MTV Winter Valencia in Spain on March 6. On December 6, they announced they were going to be part of the 2008 Vans Warped Tour.	 
	 
On May 6, 2008, From First to Last released their self-titled album, and starting June 20, hit the road on the Vans Warped Tour for its entirety.	 
		 
On June 28, From First to Last updated their band members section of their MySpace, making Chris Lent a full-time member.	 
	 
From the end of September to October 12, From First to Last played on The Blackout's "Sleep All Day, Party All Night" tour in the UK, along with The Medic Droid and We Are The Ocean.

Throne to the Wolves (2009–2010)

FFTL stated that they would be on a break from touring in late 2008. Members Travis Richter and Derek Bloom were focusing on their side project, The Color of Violence, with tours soon after and a full-length debut album, Youthanize, which was released April 7, 2009. Member Chris Lent toured as the drummer for the band I Set My Friends on Fire as well as one of the two drummers for The Color of Violence (along with Jon Syverson of the band Daughters); Lent also confirmed that he is no longer a member of FFTL and is now writing/recording with ISMFOF. FFTL began writing new songs early 2009 and started demoing new songs in March 2009 for their next album, expected to be released March 2010. A full-length demo of a song on the new album was put on their Myspace at that time, as well as the previously unheard b-side from Heroine, Save Us. A Second Full Length Demo was added on July 3, 2009, and a message to fans that they would be announcing their recording schedule and tentative label. As of August 6, 2009, the band had begun to track drums for the new record at EarthSound studios in Valdosta Georgia, with Lee Dyess.

In September 2009, Miss May I announced they would be touring with From First to Last in October 2009.

The band toured on the "You'd Be Way Cuter in a Coffin Tour" with Alesana, The Word Alive, Asking Alexandria, and Memphis May Fire in December 2009. Though recording was supposedly finished, the band was called off the road and was forced to cancel the last two weeks worth of performances – much to the dismay of fans, some of whom began to complain that the band could never finish a tour, and start rumors of a breakup – in order to go back home to Valdosta and put finishing touches on their recording. Matt Good responded to these claims and rumors

From First to Last released a new song off the album, "Going Lohan", on their MySpace page in November. The new album, Throne to the Wolves, was announced and slated for release on March 16, 2010.

In late 2009 FFTL went through yet another lineup change with Travis Richter leaving the band; no official announcement had yet been made by the band and no reason was given for his departure. Matt Good and Matt Manning have been taking over Travis's screaming role and Blake Steiner (ex-Mia Medusa guitarist), who recorded on Throne to the Wolves, is his replacement. On December 31 FFTL released the song  "I'll Inoculate The World with the Virus of My Disillusionment" on their MySpace.

On Travis' departure from the band:

On January 20, 2010, From First to Last finally made an official announcement about Travis's departure from the band via Myspace.

Travis is now the lead vocalist for the progressive metal band The Human Abstract. Richter left the band in 2011 and became a dubstep producer with the group ModifiedNoise.

Beginning on March 13, 2010 From First to Last headlined the Royal Family Tour 2010, supported by Eyes Set To Kill, Confide, Black Veil Brides and Sleeping with Sirens. That tour concluded on April 10. Eyes Set to Kill dropped off the tour for other engagements a week before.

Throne to the Wolves was released March 16, 2010. The album was received well by critics and fans alike; getting favorable reviews from Alternative Press, and Absolute Punk. The album debuted at number 24 on the Billboard Top Hard Rock Albums, and number 45 on The Top Independent Albums. This is the band's first album not to chart the Billboard 200 since Dear Diary. After spending one week on the charts it dropped off; despite its poor debut, and first week sales of less than 4000, the album has been seen as a fresh start, and a new beginning for the band.

Starting on May 8, 2010 the band toured with Our Last Night, We Came as Romans, and A Bullet For Pretty Boy on the Welcome to the Circus tour, headlined by Asking Alexandria. The tour will end on June 9

On June 10, 2010 the band will begin playing dates through June 18 supporting A Skylit Drive on the second half of the "Go Fist Pump Yourself Tour", along with Tides of Man and Abandon All Ships. I Set My Friends on Fire were originally slated to play, but ISMFOF was forced to back out due to recording delays.

Hiatus (2010–2013) 
On July 28, 2010 Matt Good announced that From First to Last was going on hiatus:

On July 29, 2010, Craig Owens posted a video on Facebook saying that Matt Good was the guitarist and keyboardist of his new band. On August 18, 2010, Owens announced account that the band is called Destroy Rebuild Until God Shows. The band's members include vocalist Craig Owens (Chiodos), drummer Aaron Stern (Matchbook Romance), guitarist/vocalist Nick Martin (Underminded), bassist Adam Russell (Story of the Year) and Matt Good in guitar, keyboards and vocals. Good left the band in 2012, now is a dubstep/electronica DJ with AJ Calderon in the duo Kit Fysto. D.R.U.G.S. disbanded in April 2012, as a result of the departure of lead singer Craig Owens who rejoined his former band Chiodos.

In 2011, Matt Manning and Blake Steiner formed the band Eye in the Sky. The band's members include Matt Simpson (drums), Blake Steiner (guitar) and Matt Manning (vocals and bass).

On August 20, 2013 Jon Weisberg launched his new band XO Stereo and released the first single Show And Tell with an accompanying music video. The band also features Justin Whitesel from LoveHateHero.

Reunion, introduction of Sotelo and Dead Trees (2013–2015) 
In November 2013, Matt Good, Derek Bloom, Matt Manning and Travis Richter reunited as From First to Last and launched a Kickstarter campaign to fund the recording of a new EP. Good said he also reached out to Sonny Moore (Skrillex) to see if he would be interested in contributing in some way. Months after exceeding its crowd-funding goal of $25,000 by raising over $30,000, the band changed its plans slightly: the recording sessions proved fruitful and the band decided to release a full-length album instead of an EP, and the lineup changed significantly. Bloom was no longer a part of the reunion and the remaining members expanded to a six-piece with the addition of vocalist Spencer Sotelo of Periphery, drummer Ernie Slenkovich and third guitarist Taylor Larson. With the new lineup, From First to Last recorded and released an online stream of a new version of "Note to Self" – originally released on Dear Diary, My Teen Angst Has a Bodycount in 2004 with Moore on vocals – to commemorate its 10-year anniversary. In the autumn of 2014, the band continued on with a tour with Black Veil Brides, Set It Off, William Control and Falling in Reverse.

From First to Last released the first single, eponymously titled "Dead Trees," off their fifth studio album on November 24, 2014. Weeks later in January 2015, From First to Last announced their signing to Sumerian Records for the release of their new album. On April 23, 2015 the band released Dead Trees through Sumerian.

Departure of Sotelo, Moore's return and the future (2016–present) 
On July 30, 2016, former vocalist Sonny Moore held a radio show on Beats 1 as Skrillex. The final song of the radio show, an untitled bonus track was, according to Alternative Press, reminiscent of prior From First to Last work with Moore's vocals. The article talked about the rumors being generated by a Facebook post regarding a possible reunion.

On August 1, 2016, Spencer Sotelo announced he left the band.

On January 15, 2017, the band released a new single, "Make War", featuring vocalist Sonny Moore and original drummer Derek Bloom returning to the band (although the single featured drummer Travis Barker instead of Bloom.) Their first show back with Moore and Bloom was on February 7, during an Emo Nite LA event in Los Angeles, California at music venue Echoplex. This marked the band's first live performance with Moore in ten years and Bloom since his departure in 2010. Longtime bassist Matt Manning also appeared with the band during the show, having only performed alongside Moore briefly before his initial departure from the band. Aside from debuting "Make War" live, the band played a set featuring material strictly off of Dear Diary.... Guitarist Taylor Larson was not present at the performance, and is no longer a member of the band.

In 2017, Moore stated that "Make War" was the first they wrote after reuniting. He later stated that the band plans to release more music.

In December 2017, the band debuted a new song entitled "Surrender" at Emo Nite Day in Los Angeles. The track was later released on July 23, 2018, with Bloom returning on drums.

Musical style
From First to Last has been described as post-hardcore, screamo, alternative rock, indie rock and emo.

Band members

Current
 Matt Good – lead guitar, co-lead vocals, keyboards (1999–2010, 2013–present), lead vocals (1999–2002, 2007–2010), rhythm guitar (1999–2002)
 Travis Richter – rhythm guitar, unclean vocals, backing vocals (2002–2009, 2013–present)
 Derek Bloom – drums, percussion (2002–2010, 2013–2014, 2017–present)
 Sonny Moore – lead vocals, additional guitar, keyboards (2004–2007, 2017–present)

Touring and session
 Alicia Simmons-Way – bass, backing vocals (2005)
 Mikey Way – bass, backing vocals (2005)
 Wes Borland – bass, backing vocals (2005–2006)
 Matt Fleischman – bass, backing vocals (2006–2007)
 Travis Barker – drums, percussion (2017)

Former
 Phillip Reardon – lead vocals, unclean vocals, keyboards, synthesizers (2002–2004) 
 Spencer Sotelo – lead vocals (2014–2016)
 Blake Steiner – rhythm guitar, backing vocals (2009–2010)
 Scott Oord – bass, backing vocals (1999–2002)
 Joey Antillion – bass (2002–2003)
 Jon Weisberg – bass, unclean vocals (2003–2005)
 Parker Nelms – drums, percussion (1999)
 Steve Pullman – drums, percussion, keyboards (1999–2002)
 Greg Taylor – drums, percussion (2002)
 Ernie Slenkovich – drums, percussion (2014–2016)
 Chris Lent – keyboards, synthesizers, percussion (2006–2009)
 Taylor Larson – rhythm/lead guitar (2014–2016)
 Matt Manning – bass, unclean vocals (2007–2010, 2013–2017)

Timeline

Discography

Studio albums
Dear Diary, My Teen Angst Has a Bodycount (2004)
Heroine (2006)
From First to Last (2008)
Throne to the Wolves (2010)
Dead Trees (2015)

Awards

Further reading

Facts

1.From First to Last was initially formed in 1999 as First too Last in high school before renaming the band From First to Last in 2002. Founding member Matt Good was lead vocalist and guitarist of First to Last from 1999 to 2002 and again as From First to Last from 2007 to 2010, in which he featured as lead vocalist/guitarist on albums, From First to Last and Throne to Wolves.

References

External links
 Archived website

Musical groups established in 1999
Emo musical groups from Florida
American post-hardcore musical groups
Epitaph Records artists
Owsla artists
Musical groups from California
Musical groups from Orlando, Florida
Rise Records artists
Sumerian Records artists
1999 establishments in the United States